John Roosevelt may refer to:

John Roosevelt (c.1689–1750), colonial American politician, ancestor of President Theodore Roosevelt
John Aspinwall Roosevelt (1916–1981), American businessman, son of President Franklin D. Roosevelt
John Ellis Roosevelt (1853–1939), American lawyer, cousin of President Theodore Roosevelt

See also
John Roosevelt Boettiger (born 1939), American psychology professor and grandson of President Franklin D. Roosevelt
Roosevelt family